Auguste Louzier Sainte-Anne (2 December 1848–1925) was a French architect.

1848 births
1925 deaths
People from Sens
19th-century French architects
20th-century French architects
Chevaliers of the Légion d'honneur